Nabisco (abbreviated from the earlier name National Biscuit Company) is an American manufacturer of cookies and snacks headquartered in East Hanover, New Jersey. The company is a subsidiary of Illinois-based Mondelēz International.

Nabisco's  plant in Chicago is the largest bakery in the world, employing more than 1,200 workers and producing around 320 million pounds of snack foods annually. Its products include Chips Ahoy!, Belvita, Oreo cookies, Ritz Crackers, Teddy Grahams, Triscuit crackers, Fig Newtons, and Wheat Thins for the United States, United Kingdom, Mexico, Bolivia, Venezuela, and other parts of South America.

All Nabisco cookie or cracker products are branded Christie in Canada. Nabisco opened corporate offices as the National Biscuit Company in the Home Insurance Building in the Chicago Loop in 1898, the world's first skyscraper.

History 

Pearson & Sons Bakery opened in Massachusetts in 1792, and they made a biscuit called pilot bread for consumption on long sea voyages. In 1889, William H. Moore acquired "Pearson & Sons Bakery", "Josiah Bent Bakery", and six other bakeries to start the "New York Biscuit Company". Chicago lawyer Adolphus Green (1843–1917) started the American Biscuit and Manufacturing Company in 1890 after acquiring 40 different bakeries. Then Moore, Green, and John Gottlieb Zeller (1849–1939, founder of Richmond Steam Bakery) all merged in 1898 to form the "National Biscuit Company", and Green was named president. Zeller was president of National Biscuit Company from 1923–1931.

Nabisco celebrated its golden anniversary in 1948, and Nabisco had become the corporate name by 1971. In 1981, Nabisco merged with Standard Brands to form "Nabisco Brands", which merged with R. J. Reynolds Tobacco Company in 1985 to form RJR Nabisco. Kraft General Foods acquired the Nabisco cold cereals from RJR Nabisco in 1993, and the cereal brands are now owned by Post Holdings. In 1999, Nabisco acquired Favorite Brands International. In 2000, Philip Morris Companies Inc. acquired Nabisco and merged it with Kraft Foods in one of the largest mergers in the food industry. In 2011, Kraft Foods announced that it was splitting into a grocery company and a snack food company. Nabisco became part of the snack-food business, which took the name Mondelēz International.

The first use of the name Nabisco was in a cracker brand produced by National Biscuit Company in 1901. The firm later introduced Fig Newtons, Nabisco Wafers, Anola Wafers, Barnum's Animal Crackers (1902), Cameos (1910), Lorna Doones (1912), Oreos (1912), and Famous Chocolate Wafers (1924).

In 1924, the National Biscuit Company introduced a snack in a sealed packet called the Peanut Sandwich Packet. They soon added the Sorbetto Sandwich Packet. These allowed salesmen to sell to soda fountains, road stands, milk bars, lunch rooms, and news stands. Sales increased, and the company started to use the name NAB in 1928. The term Nabs today is used to generically mean any type of snack crackers, most commonly in the southern US.

As of July 16, 2021, parent company Mondelēz International made the decision to close the Fair Lawn plant after 63 years forcing the majority of the 600 employees to move on and/or retire, accept jobs with other businesses or transfer within the company.

In August 2021, over 1,000 workers at several bakeries and distribution centers throughout the United States, organized under the Bakery, Confectionery, Tobacco Workers and Grain Millers' International Union, went on strike over disagreements regarding a new labor contract with Nabisco.

Mergers and acquisitions

Acquisitions

The National Biscuit Company acquired the Shredded Wheat Company, maker of Triscuit and Shredded Wheat cereal, and Christie, Brown & Company of Toronto in 1928, but all of the Nabisco cookie and cracker products in Canada still use the name Christie. It also acquired F.H. Bennett Company, maker of Milk-Bone dog biscuits, in 1931. When Kraft bought Nabisco, it included Christie.

In 1981, Nabisco merged with Standard Brands, maker of Planters Nuts, Baby Ruth and Butterfinger candy bars, Royal gelatin, Fleischmann's and Blue Bonnet margarines, amongst others. The company was then renamed Nabisco Brands, Inc. At that time, it also acquired the Life Savers brand from the E.R. Squibb Company, makers of Bubble Yum & Care-free gum. Commercials were revised as a result of the merger by January 1983.

R. J. Reynolds merger

In 1985, Nabisco was bought by R.J. Reynolds, forming "RJR Nabisco". After three years of mixed results, the company became one of the hotspots in the 1980s leveraged buyout mania. The company was in auction with two bidders: F. Ross Johnson, the company's president and CEO, and Kohlberg Kravis Roberts, a private equity partnership.

The company was sold to KKR in what was then the biggest leveraged buyout in history, described in the book Barbarians at the Gate: The Fall of RJR Nabisco, and a subsequent film.

Subsequent acquisitions and divestitures
In 1989 RJR Nabisco Inc. sold its Chun King foods division to Yeo Hiap Seng Limited and Fullerton Holdings Pte. Ltd for $52 million to reduce its debt from its $24.5 billion buyout by Kohlberg Kravis Roberts & Co.
 
In December 1989 RJR Nabisco sold its Del Monte canned fruits and vegetables business in South America to Polly Peck International PLC.  One year later, in 1990 RJR Nabisco sold Curtiss Candy, which owned the Baby Ruth and Butterfinger brands, to Nestlé.  RJR also sold LU, Belin and other European biscuit brands to Groupe Danone, only reunited in 2007 after Nabisco's present parent, Kraft Foods, bought Danone's biscuit operations for EUR 5.3 billion.

In 1994 RJR sold its breakfast cereal business (primarily the Shredded Wheat franchise) to Kraft Foods Inc. and the international licenses to General Mills, which later became part of the Cereal Partners Worldwide joint venture with Nestlé.

Also in 1994, RJR acquired Rose Knox's Knox gelatin and integrated the Shredded wheat franchise into the Post Foods portfolio.  Post continues to sell the product today.

In 1995, Nestlé agreed to buy the Ortega Mexican foods business from Nabisco Inc.  That same year, RJR-Nabisco also acquired the North American margarine and table spreads business of Kraft foods. This purchase included Parkay, Touch of Butter and Chiffon.
 
In 1998 Nabisco Holdings announced its sale of its margarine and egg substitute business to ConAgra.In 1997 the brands of Fleishmann's, Blue Bonnet and Parkay had sales of $480 million.  It also sold its College Inn broth brand to HJ Heinz and its Venezuelan Del Monte operations to Del Monte Foods.
 
In 1999 RJR Nabisco's food and tobacco empire fell apart when they sold its international tobacco division to Japan Tobacco for $7.8 billion.

In 2000 Nabisco Holdings together with several investors (as Finalrealm) acquired United Biscuits, As part of the transaction, United Biscuits acquired Nabisco's European businesses and divested Far East (China, Hong Kong, and Taiwan) business to Nabisco. Nabisco became a leading shareholder in United Biscuits (the position that inherited by Kraft Foods until 2006).

The Altria Group (formerly Philip Morris)  acquired Nabisco (sans Bubble Yum which was sold to Hershey) in 2000 for about $19.2 billion. Philip Morris then combined Nabisco with Kraft.  That acquisition was approved by the Federal Trade Commission subject to the divestiture of products in five areas: three Jell-O and Royal brands types of products (dry-mix gelatin dessert, dry-mix pudding, no-bake desserts), intense mints (such as Altoids), and baking powder. Kraft Foods, at the time also a subsidiary of Altria, merged with Nabisco.
 
In 2006 Nabisco sold its Milk-Bone pet snacks to Del Monte Foods Co. for $580 million.

Kraft Foods was spun off from Altria, taking its Nabisco subsidiary with it, in 2007.  In January 2007 Cream of Wheat was sold to B&G Foods.

Legal battles
In 1997, the National Advertising Division of the Council of Better Business Bureaus became concerned with an ad campaign for Planters Deluxe Mixed Nuts. The initial commercial featured a man and monkey deserted on an island. They discover a crate of Planters peanuts and rejoice in the peanuts' positive health facts.

Nabisco made a detailed statement describing how their peanuts were healthier than most other snack products, going as far as comparing the nutritional facts of Planters peanuts to those of potato chips, Cheddar cheese chips, and popcorn. Technically, the commercials complied with United States Food and Drug Administration regulations, and they were allowed to continue. However, as requested by the National Advertising Division, Nabisco agreed to make fat content disclosure more conspicuous in future commercials.

The company's A1 Steak Sauce was the subject of a legal battle against a venue called Arnie's Deli in 1991. The delicatessen was selling and using a homemade sauce called "A2 Sauce." The verdict favored Nabisco.

Brands and products 

 100 Calorie Packs
 Arrowroot
 Bacon Dippers
 Belvita
 Better Cheddars
 Cameo
 Captain's Table
 Cheese Nips
 Chips Ahoy! 
 Chicken in a Biskit
 Chocolate Wafers
 Club Social
 Corn Diggers
 Crispers (Canada)
 Dad's Cookie (c.1929 Canada)
 Dizzy Grizzlies
 Doo Dads
 Frollini de Oro Saiwa
 Fudgee-O Cookies (Canada)
 Giggles
 Good Thins
 HeyDay Cookie Bars
 Honey Maid
 Hony Bran
 In A Biskit
 Kool Stuf toaster pastry
 Kraker Bran
 Lorna Doone
 Mallomars chocolate marshmallow
 Mister Salty Pretzels
 Nabisco Classics
 Newtons
 Nilla
 Nutter Butter
 Orchard Crisps
 Oreo
 List of Oreo varieties
 Oro Saiwa
 Pecanz
 Pirate
 Potato Chipsters
 Premium Plus
 Premium Saltines
 Ritz Crackers
 Rice Thins
 Royal gelatin dessert
 Royal Lunch 
 Sea Rounds
 Shredded wheat
 Social Tea
 Sportz
 Sugar Rings
 Team Flakes
 Teddy Grahams
 Thinsations
 Toasted Chips
 Toastettes
 Triscuit
 Twigs
 Uneeda Biscuit
 Urra Saiwa
 Wheat Squares
 Wheat Thins
 Zu Zu Ginger Snaps
 Zwieback Toast

Corporate image 

Nabisco's trademark is a diagonal ellipse with a series of antenna-like lines protruding from the top ("Orb and Cross" or Globus cruciger). It forms the base of its logo and can be seen imprinted on Oreo cookies, in addition to Nabisco product boxes and literature. The company has claimed in promotional material that it is an early European symbol for quality. It may be derived from a medieval Italian printer's mark that represented "the triumph of the moral and spiritual over the evil and the material", or it might represent "Christ's redemption of the world" or the act of winnowing, separating grain from chaff.

The current update of the familiar Nabisco trademark was designed by American typographer and graphic designer Gerard Huerta, who has created many famous logos for corporate identity and branding as well as the movie and music industries, such as AC/DC's.

Sponsorship 
From 2002–2005, Nabisco and Kraft jointly sponsored both Dale Earnhardt, Inc., and Roush Racing. Earnhardt Jr. won four races in a row at Daytona International Speedway with Nabisco sponsorship. Kraft and Nabisco sponsored a part-time Sprint Cup effort in car #81 driven by Jason Keller and John Andretti and fielded by Dale Earnhardt, Inc. Nabisco also sponsored Dale Earnhardt Jr. in the 2010 Subway Jalapeño 250 at Daytona International Speedway in July 2010 with their Oreo/Ritz brands and Tony Stewart with the Ritz brand in the 2010 DRIVE4COPD 300 at Daytona International Speedway in 2010.

References

Notes

External links

  (Snack Worlds.com)
 FTC summary of competitive concerns about the 2000 acquisition of Nabisco
 Historic Nabisco factory in Detroit

 
Mondelez International
Snack food manufacturers of the United States
Food and drink companies established in 1898
American companies established in 1898
1898 establishments in New Jersey
Companies based in Morris County, New Jersey
Mondelez International brands
Food manufacturers of the United States
East Hanover Township, New Jersey
1985 mergers and acquisitions
2000 mergers and acquisitions